Kutalli is a village and a former municipality in Berat County, central Albania. At the 2015 local government reform it became a subdivision of the municipality Dimal. The population at the 2011 census was 9,643. The village is populated by Albanians & Aromanians.

Geography 

Closest places to  Kutalli: Samaticë (2 miles), Pobrat (1 mile), Drenovicë (1 mile), Rërës (1 mile), Protoduar (2 miles), Sqepur (2 miles), Goricani Çlirimi (2 miles), Malas-Gropë (2 miles).

References

Administrative units of Dimal, Albania
Former municipalities in Berat County
Villages in Berat County
Populated places disestablished in 2015